The United Kingdom competed under the name Great Britain and Northern Ireland. The nation was represented by 82 athletes at the 2012 European Athletics Championships held in Helsinki, Finland, between 26 June - 1 July 2012.

A preliminary squad of 109 athletes was announced on 18 June 2012. However, due to the proximity of the London Olympics, any athlete who was qualified for the Olympics would not take part in the European Championships. As the Olympic Trials were held less than a week before the European Championships, the complete team was not announced until 25 June 2012. However, automatically selected field athletes were permitted to compete, if the event complimented their training schedule. Reigning European champion, Mo Farah (5,000m), was given special dispensation to defend his title. However, reigning champions Jessica Ennis and Dai Greene were absent due to their Olympic selection and Philips Idowu was injured. Shana Cox and Christine Ohuruogu had qualified for the Olympics, and were taken as part of the relay team, and not permitted to participate individually. A number of high-profile athletes were also seeking Olympic selection following the Olympic trials. Many athletes who won, or finished second, at the Olympic trials, were requiring an Olympic 'A' Standard, to receive automatic selection.

Finally, at the Championships, 73 athletes took part in the events.

Medals

Results

Men

Track

*Athletes who run the heats but not the final.

Combined

Field

Women

Track

*Athletes who run in the heats but not in the final.

Field

References 

 Participants list

Nations at the 2012 European Athletics Championships
2012
European Athletics Championships